Bembidion sejunctum is a species of beetle in the family Carabidae. It is found on Saint Pierre and Miquelon and Magdalen Islands as well as in Canada and the United States.

Subspecies
These two subspecies belong to the species Bembidion sejunctum.
Bembidion sejunctum sejunctum Casey, 1918
Bembidion sejunctum semiaureum Fall, 1922

References

Further reading

sejunctum
Beetles of North America
Beetles described in 1918